Barrie Stanton Ingham (10 February 1932 – 23 January 2015) was an English actor. He was prolific in television, but also performed on stage and in several films.

Early life
Ingham was born in 1932 in Halifax, West Yorkshire, to Irene (née Bolton) and Harold Ellis Stead Ingham. He was educated at Heath Grammar School and became a Royal Artillery officer.

Acting career
Ingham made his debut in Manchester with the Library Theatre Company, and then he moved to London's Old Vic. He also performed with the Royal Shakespeare Company, Mermaid Theatre Company and Royal National Theatre.

Ingham featured in over 200 British and American films and TV productions. He played the lead role of Robin Hood in A Challenge for Robin Hood (1967). After playing Sejanus in Granada TV's The Caesars (1968), he had a short spell as an ambitious government minister in The Power Game in 1969. In 1971, Ingham took the leading role in the series Hine, as an unscrupulous arms dealer. Sir John Gielgud gave him his Broadway debut and he subsequently played in many Broadway musicals, including Copperfield on Broadway, and opposite Angela Lansbury in the London production of Gypsy: A Musical Fable in 1973. When the production transferred to Broadway, Ingham did not remain with the show. He was acclaimed for his performance as King Pellinore in the 1981-82 revival of Camelot  starring Richard Harris. In 1986, he voiced Basil of Baker Street, the lead character of Disney's The Great Mouse Detective.

In 1991-92, Bingham was in the final cast of Andrew Lloyd Webber's Aspects of Love, opposite Sarah Brightman on Broadway. His last Broadway outing was in the Broadway musical Jekyll & Hyde as Sir Danvers Carew. Ingham opened the show in 1997 and remained with it for four years until closing in January 2001. He also appeared in the 2001 film version of the musical.

Ingham appeared onstage in Australia, appearing in Noël Coward's Private Lives, in Sydney in 1976. He made a guest appearance on Star Trek: The Next Generation in the 1989 episode "Up the Long Ladder".

Personal life
Ingham married Tarne Phillips Ingham in 1957; together they had four children.

Death
Ingham died 18 days shy of his 83rd birthday, at his home in Palm Beach Gardens, Florida. He was survived by his wife, Tarne Phillips Ingham, and four children.

Filmography

Film

Television

References

External links
BarrieIngham.com Barrie Ingham's official personal website; accessed 24 January 2015.

Barrie Ingham at the British Theatre History Archive, University of Bristol; accessed 24 January 2015.

1932 births
2015 deaths
English male film actors
English male stage actors
English male television actors
English male voice actors
People educated at Heath Grammar School
Royal Artillery officers
People from Halifax, West Yorkshire
People from Palm Beach Gardens, Florida